The Rilke trail is a tourist trail, providing a scenic view of the Gulf of Trieste. It is named after the poet Rainer Maria Rilke.

It connects the villages of Duino and Sistiana, both in the municipality of Duino-Aurisina.

Features
For a long time the trail was abandoned but in 1987 it was restored by the Province of Trieste.

At the beginning of the path, Sistiana Bay can be seen, and local flora and fauna can be seen at the end, near Duino Castle.

Over the course of the trail there are three observation points created during World War II.

References

External links
Description of the Castle of Duino, and images of the path
Google map of the trail, starting from Sistiana Bay

Hiking trails in Italy
Province of Trieste
Tourist attractions in Friuli-Venezia Giulia
Geography of Friuli-Venezia Giulia
Rainer Maria Rilke